Thestor holmesi, the Holmes's skolly, is a butterfly of the family Lycaenidae. It is found in South Africa, where it is known to range in the West Cape, from the Outeniqua Mountains and Jonkershoek.

The wingspan is 26.5-35.5 mm for males and 30.5-39.5 mm for females. Adults are on wing from December to early January. There is one generation per year.

References

Butterflies described in 1951
Thestor
Endemic butterflies of South Africa